Fedora Linux is a popular Linux distribution developed by the Fedora Project. Fedora attempts to maintain a six-month release schedule, offering new versions in May and November, although some releases have experienced minor delays.

Release history

Fedora Core 1
Fedora Core 1 was the first version of Fedora and was released on November 6, 2003. It was codenamed Yarrow. Fedora Core 1 was based on Red Hat Linux 9. 

Some of the features in Fedora Core 1 included:

 Version 2.4.19 of the Linux kernel;
 Version 2.4 of the GNOME Desktop Environment (GNOME);
 Version 3.1 of the K Desktop Environment (KDE).

Fedora Core 2
Fedora Core 2 was released on May 18, 2004, codenamed Tettnang. 

Some of the new features in Fedora Core 2 included:

 Version 2.6 of the Linux kernel;
 Version 2.6 of the GNOME Desktop Environment (GNOME);
 Version 3.2 of the K Desktop Environment (KDE);
 Security-Enhanced Linux (SELinux);
 New X.org.

SELinux was disabled by default due to concerns that it radically altered the way that Fedora Core ran. XFree86 was replaced by the newer X.org, a merger of the previous official X11R6 release, which additionally included a number of updates to Xrender, Xft, Xcursor, fontconfig libraries, and other significant improvements.

Fedora Core 3
Fedora Core 3 was released on November 8, 2004, codenamed Heidelberg. 

Some of the new features in Fedora Core 3 included:

 The Mozilla Firefox web browser;
 Support for Indic scripts;
 GNU GRUB boot loader;
 Version 2.8 of the GNOME desktop environment (GNOME);
 Version 3.3 of the K Desktop Environment (KDE);
 New Fedora Extras repository;
 SELinux enabled by default.

This release deprecated the LILO boot loader in favor of GNU GRUB. Security-Enhanced Linux (SELinux) now had a new targeted policy, which was less strict than the policy used in Fedora Core 2.

Fedora Core 4
Fedora Core 4 was released on June 13, 2005, with the codename Stentz. It shipped with Linux 2.6.11, KDE 3.4 and GNOME 2.10. This version introduced the new Clearlooks theme, which was inspired by the Red Hat Bluecurve theme. It also shipped with the OpenOffice.org 2.0 office suite, as well as Xen, a high performance and secure open source virtualization framework. It also introduced support for the PowerPC CPU architecture, and over 80 new policies for Security-Enhanced Linux (SELinux).

Fedora Core 5
This Core release introduced specific artwork that defined it. This is a trend that has continued in later Fedora versions.

Fedora Core 5 was released on March 20, 2006, with the codename Bordeaux, and introduced the Fedora Bubbles artwork. It was the first Fedora release to include Mono and tools built with it such as Beagle, F-Spot and Tomboy. It also introduced new package management tools such as pup and pirut (see Yellowdog Updater, Modified). It also was the first Fedora release not to include the long deprecated (but kept for compatibility) LinuxThreads, replaced by the Native POSIX Thread Library.

Fedora Core 6
Fedora Core 6 was released on October 24, 2006, codenamed Zod. This release introduced the Fedora DNA artwork, replacing the Fedora Bubbles artwork used in Fedora Core 5. The codename is derived from the villain, General Zod, from the Superman DC Comic Books. This version introduced support for the Compiz compositing window manager and AIGLX (a technology that enables GL-accelerated effects on a standard desktop). It shipped with Firefox 1.5 as the default web browser, and Smolt, a tool that allows users to inform developers about the hardware they use.

Fedora Linux 7
Fedora Linux 7, codenamed Moonshine, was released on May 31, 2007. The biggest difference between Fedora Core 6 and Fedora 7 was the merging of the Red Hat "Core" and Community "Extras" repositories, dropping "Core" from the name "Fedora Core," and the new build system put in place to manage those packages. This release used entirely new build and compose tools that enabled the user to create fully customized Fedora distributions via a package named Revisor that could also include packages from any third-party provider.

There were three official spins available for Fedora 7:
Live – two Live CDs (one for GNOME and one for KDE);
Fedora – a DVD that includes all the major packages available at shipping;
Everything – simply an installation tree for use by yum and Internet installations.

Fedora 7 featured GNOME 2.18 and KDE 3.5, a new theme entitled Flying High, OpenOffice.org 2.2 and Firefox 2.0. This theme included a complete refresh of the various icons and symbols. Fast user switching was fully integrated and enabled by default. Also, there were a number of updates to SELinux, including a new setroubleshoot tool for debugging SELinux security notifications, and a new, comprehensive system-config-selinux tool for fine-tuning the SELinux setup.

Fedora Linux 8
Fedora Linux 8, codenamed Werewolf, was released on November 8, 2007.

Some of the new features and updates in Fedora 8 included:
PulseAudio – a sound daemon that allows different applications to control the audio. Fedora was the first distribution to enable it by default.
system-config-firewall – a new firewall configuration tool that replaces system-config-security level from previous releases.
Codeina – a tool that guides users using content under proprietary or patent-encumbered formats to purchase codecs from fluendo; it is an optional component that may be uninstalled in favor of GStreamer codec plug-ins which are free of charge.
IcedTea – a project that attempts to bring OpenJDK to Fedora by replacing encumbered code.
NetworkManager – faster, more reliable connections; better security (through the use of the keyring); clearer display of wireless networks; better D-Bus integration.
Better laptop support – enhancements to the kernel to reduce battery load, disabling of background cron jobs when running on the battery, and additional wireless drivers.

Due to criticism regarding inconsistent UI in Fedora 7 and its previous versions, Fedora 8 also included a new desktop artwork entitled Infinity and a new desktop theme named Nodoka, replacing the Flying High theme in the predecessor. A unique feature of Infinity was that the wallpaper could change to reflect the time of day.

In February 2008, a new Xfce Live CD "spin" was announced for the x86 and x86-64 architectures. This Live CD version uses the Xfce desktop environment, which aims to be fast and lightweight, while still being visually appealing and easy to use. Like the GNOME and KDE spins, the Xfce spin can be installed to the hard disk.

Fedora Linux 9
Fedora Linux 9, codenamed Sulphur, was released on May 13, 2008.

Some of the new features of Fedora 9 included:
GNOME 2.22.
KDE Plasma 4.0, which is the default interface as part of the KDE spin.
OpenJDK 6 has replaced IcedTea.
PackageKit is included as a front-end to yum, and as the default package manager.
One Second X allows the X Window System to perform a cold start from the command line in nearly one second; similarly, shutdown of X should be as quick.
Upstart introduced
Many improvements to the Anaconda installer; among these features, it now supports resizing ext2, ext3 and NTFS file systems, and can create and install Fedora to encrypted file systems.
Firefox 3.0 beta 5 is included in this release, and the 3.0 package was released as an update the same day as the general release.
Perl 5.10, which features a smaller memory footprint and other improvements.
Data Persistence in USB images.

Fedora 9 featured a new artwork entitled Waves which, like Infinity in Fedora 8, changes the wallpaper to reflect the time of day.

Fedora Linux 10
Fedora Linux 10, codenamed Cambridge, was released on November 25, 2008. It flaunts the new Solar artwork. Its features include:
Faster startup using one Plymouth splash screen for all future releases (instead of the Red Hat Graphical Boot specific for each version used in previous versions)
Support for ext4 filesystem
Sugar Desktop Environment
LXDE Desktop Environment (LXDE Spin)
GNOME 2.24
KDE Plasma 4.1 (KDE Spin)
OpenOffice.org 3.0

Fedora Linux 11
Fedora Linux 11, codenamed Leonidas, was released on June 9, 2009. This was the first release whose artwork is determined by the name instead of by users voting on themes.

Some of the features in Fedora 11 are:
ext4 as the default file system
experimental Btrfs activated by IcantbelieveitsnotBTR command line option at bootup
faster bootup aimed at 20 seconds.
GCC 4.4
GNOME 2.26
KDE Plasma 4.2 (KDE Spin)
2.6.29 Linux kernel
Eclipse 3.4.2
Netbeans 6.5
nVidia kernel modesetting through the open source nouveau (graphics) driver.
OpenOffice 3.1
Python 2.6
Xfce to 4.6 (Xfce Spin)
X server 1.6
fprint – support for systems with fingerprint readers

Fedora Linux 12
Fedora Linux 12, codenamed Constantine, was released on November 17, 2009. Red Hat Enterprise Linux 6 and other derivatives are based on Fedora 12.

Some of the features in Fedora 12 are:
Optimized performance. All software packages on 32-bit (x86_32) architecture have been compiled for i686 systems
Improved Webcam support (Cheese)
Better video codec with a newer version of Ogg Theora
Audio improvements
Automatic bug reporting tool (abrt)
Bluetooth on demand
Enhanced NetworkManager to manage broadband
Many virtualization enhancements (KVM, libvirt, libguestfs)
ext4 used even for the boot partition
Moblin interface
Yum-presto plugin providing Delta RPMs for updates by default
New compression algorithm (XZ, the new LZMA format) in RPM packages for smaller and faster updates
Experimental 3D support for ATI R600/R700 cards
GCC 4.4
SystemTap 1.0 with Eclipse integration
GNOME 2.28
GNOME Shell preview
KDE Plasma 4.3, Plasma 4.4 was pushed to updates repository on February 27, 2010 (KDE Spin)
2.6.31 Linux kernel, Kernel 2.6.32 was pushed to updates repository on February 27, 2010
X server 1.7 with Multi-Pointer X (MPX) support
NetBeans 6.7
PHP 5.3
Rakudo Perl 6 compiler

Fedora Linux 13
Fedora Linux 13, codenamed "Goddard", was released on May 25, 2010. During early development, Fedora project leader Paul Frields anticipated "looking at the fit and finish issues. We have tended to build a really tight ship with Fedora, but now we want to make the décor in the cabins a little more sumptuous and to polish the deck chairs and railings."

Features of Fedora 13 include:
Automatic printer-driver installation
Automatic language pack installation
Redesigned user-account tool
Color management to calibrate monitors and scanners
Experimental 3D support for NVIDIA video cards
A new way to install Fedora over the Internet
SSSD authentication for users
Updates to NFS
Inclusion of Zarafa Open Source edition
System rollback for the Btrfs file system
Better SystemTap probes
Support for the entire Java EE 6 spec in Netbeans 6.8
KDE Plasma PulseAudio Integration
New command-line interface for NetworkManager

Fedora Linux 14
Fedora Linux 14, codenamed Laughlin, was released on November 2, 2010. It was the last to use the GNOME 2 desktop environment (now forked as MATE). GNOME 2 had been the desktop environment of the operating system since its inception in 2003.

Features of Fedora 14 included:
Updated Boost to the upstream 1.44 release
Addition of the D compiler (LDC) and D standard runtime library (Tango)
Concurrent release of Fedora 14 on the Amazon EC2 cloud
Updated Fedora's Eclipse stack to Helios releases
Updated Erlang to the upstream R14 release
Replacement of libjpeg with libjpeg-turbo
Inclusion of virt-v2v tool
Inclusion of Spice framework for VDI deployment
Updates to Rakudo Star implementation of Perl 6
NetBeans IDE updated to the 6.9 release
Inclusion of ipmiutil system management tool
Inclusion of a tech preview of the GNOME Shell environment
Python 2.7

Fedora Linux 15
Fedora Linux 15, codenamed Lovelock, was released on May 24, 2011. Features of Fedora 15 include:
Inclusion of GNOME 3 desktop
LibreOffice replaced OpenOffice.org
Inclusion of GNU Compiler Collection 4.6
Responsibility for booting is taken up by Systemd
LLVMpipe replacing Mesa software rasterizer
Inclusion of BoxGrinder software
Support for dynamic firewalls with firewalld
Inclusion of PowerTOP 2.x
Adoption of Consistent Network Device Naming
Better support for encrypted Home directories

Fedora Linux 16
Fedora Linux 16, codenamed "Verne", was released on November 8, 2011. Fedora 16 was also dedicated to the memory of Dennis Ritchie, who died about a month before the release.

Some of the features of Fedora 16 included:
Linux kernel 3.1.0
Inclusion of GNOME 3.2.1 desktop
Updated to latest KDE Software Compilation 4.7.2
GRUB2 begun the default boot-loader
Ext4 driver used for Ext3 and Ext2 file systems
HAL daemon removed in favour of udisks, upower, and libudev
Unification of the user interfaces for all problem reporting programs and mechanisms
Virtualization improvements including OpenStack and Aeolus Conductor
Fedora uses UID/GIDs up through 999 for system accounts
Enhanced cloud support including Condor Cloud, HekaFS, and pacemaker-cloud

Fedora Linux 17
Fedora Linux 17, codenamed "Beefy Miracle", which was released on May 29, 2012.

Some of the features of Fedora 17 include:
Linux kernel 3.3.4
Integrated UEFI support.
Inclusion of GNOME 3.4 desktop, offering software rendering support for GNOME Shell
Updated to latest KDE Software Compilation 4.8.3
A new filesystem structure moving more things to/usr
Removable disks are now mounted under/run/media due to a change in udisks
systemd-logind replaces ConsoleKit, offering multiseat improvements
Inclusion of the libvirt sandbox; virt-manager now supports USB pass-through
Services now use private temp directories to improve security

Fedora Linux 18
Fedora Linux 18, codenamed "Spherical Cow", was released on January 15, 2013.

Some of the features of Fedora 18 include:
Linux kernel 3.6.10
Support for UEFI Secure Boot
A rewrite of the Anaconda installer
A new system upgrade utility called FedUp
Default desktop upgraded to GNOME 3.6.3
Updated to KDE Plasma 4.9 and Xfce 4.10
Inclusion of MATE and Cinnamon desktops
Better Active Directory support through FreeIPA v3
Support for NetworkManager hotspots
Support for 256 color terminals by default
Offline system updates utilizing systemd and PackageKit
Better cloud computing support with the inclusion of Eucalyptus, Heat, and OpenStack Folsom
firewalld replaces system-config-firewall as default

Fedora Linux 19
Fedora Linux 19, codenamed "Schrödinger's Cat", was released on July 2, 2013. Red Hat Enterprise Linux 7 and other derivatives are based on Fedora 19.

Some of the features of Fedora 19 include:
Further improvements to the new Anaconda installer
A new initial setup application
Support to application checkpointing through CRIU
Default desktop upgraded to GNOME 3.8
Updated to KDE Plasma 4.10 and MATE 1.6
MariaDB has replaced MySQL
GCC has been updated to version 4.8
RPM Package Manager has been updated to version 4.11
Includes the new Developers Assistant tool
Numerous upstream improvements to firewall and systemd
Improved cloud support, including better compatibility with Amazon EC2

Fedora Linux 20
Fedora Linux 20, the last codenamed release named "Heisenbug", was released on December 17, 2013.

Some of the features of Fedora 20 include:
GNOME 3.10
ARM as primary architecture in addition to x86 and x86_64
Replacement of the gnome-packagekit frontends with a new application installer, tentatively named gnome-software
Shortly after the release of Fedora 20, the Fedora project team decided to abolish the codename system completely due to inconvenience, which meant that future Fedora releases would only be referred to by their version number.

Fedora Linux 21
Fedora Linux 21, the first version without a codename, was released on December 9, 2014.
GNOME desktop 3.14 with several minor visual enhancements 
Due to concerns regarding lack of direction, Fedora introduced three flavors providing different specialized set of preinstalled packages depending on use purpose: Workstation, Server, and Cloud

Fedora Linux 22
Fedora Linux 22 was released on May 26, 2015.

Major features include:
GNOME 3.16 with a completely redesigned notification system and automatically hiding scrollbars
DNF replacing yum as the default package manager
The default display server for the GNOME Display Manager being Wayland instead of Xorg

Fedora Linux 23
Fedora Linux 23 was released on November 3, 2015.
GNOME desktop 3.18
Inclusion of the LibreOffice 5 update
The Fedora release updater, FedUp, was integrated into DNF. Thus, FedUp was deprecated.
It uses a Python3 (specifically python3.4.3) as the operating system's default Python implementation.
See also.

Fedora Linux 24
Fedora Linux 24 was released on June 21, 2016. Some notable system wide changes include: 

 GNOME Desktop 3.20 
 GCC 6
 Python 3.5
 New system-wide font used by default

Fedora Linux 25
Fedora Linux 25 was released on November 22, 2016. Some notable changes (see  for more)
are the use of the Wayland display system, Unicode 9, PHP 7.0, Node.js 6 and IBus Emoji typing.

Fedora Linux 26
Fedora Linux 26 was released on July 11, 2017.

Fedora Linux 27
Fedora Linux 27 was released on November 14, 2017.

The Workstation edition of Fedora 27 features GNOME 3.26. Both the Display and Network configuration panels have been updated, along with the overall Settings panel appearance improvement. The system search now shows more results at once, including the system actions. This release also features LibreOffice 5.4.

Fedora Linux 28
Fedora Linux 28 was released on May 1, 2018. Red Hat Enterprise Linux 8 and other derivatives are based on Fedora 28.

Notable new features: a modular software repository, curated third-party software repositories.

Fedora Linux 29
Fedora Linux 29 was released on October 30, 2018.

Notable new features: Fedora Modularity across all variants, a new optional package repository called Modular (also referred to as the "Application Stream" or AppStream), Gnome 3.30, ZRAM for ARM images, Fedora Scientific Vagrant images

Fedora Linux 30
Fedora Linux 30 was released on April 30, 2019. Its change set is here.

Fedora Linux 31
Fedora Linux 31 was released October 29, 2019. Its change set is here.

Fedora Linux 32
Fedora Linux 32 was released April 28, 2020. Its change set is here.

Fedora Linux 33
Fedora Linux 33 was released on October 27, 2020. Its change set is here. Fedora 33 Workstation Edition was the first version of the operating system to default to using Btrfs as its default file system, and replacement of a swap partition with zram. It featured version 3.38 of the GNOME desktop environment, and Linux kernel 5.8.15. For the first time since version 7, Fedora defaulted to a slideshow background (four png images of the Earth, from space) that changes hue according to the time of day. GNU nano became the default text editor for the command-line interface in place of vi. Fedora IoT, while previously available as a "Fedora Spin", was promoted to an official edition of the operating system.

Fedora Linux 34
Fedora Linux 34 was released April 27, 2021.Red Hat Enterprise Linux 9 and other derivatives are based on Fedora 34. Its change set includes GNOME 40, filesystem compression by default, exclusive use of Pipewire, and defaulting KDE Plasma to Wayland.

Fedora Linux 35
Fedora Linux 35 was released on November 2, 2021.

Fedora Linux 36
Fedora Linux 36 was released on May 10, 2022.

Fedora Linux 37
Fedora Linux 37 was released on November 15, 2022.

Images gallery

References

External links

Fedora Project
Lists of operating systems
Software version histories